František Dyršmíd (1901 – August 1971) was a Czech wrestler. He competed in the Greco-Roman featherweight event at the 1924 Summer Olympics.

References

External links
 

1901 births
1971 deaths
Olympic wrestlers of Czechoslovakia
Wrestlers at the 1924 Summer Olympics
Czech male sport wrestlers
Place of birth missing